This is a list of the suttas in the Khuddaka Nikaya collection of minor suttas, part of the Tipitaka Buddhist Canon.

Khuddakapatha

Dhammapada

The Dhammapada does not contain Suttas. It contains only 423 verses in 26 chapters.

Udana

Exclamations

Itivuttaka

Sutta Nipata

See also
List of suttas
List of Digha Nikaya suttas
List of Majjhima Nikaya suttas
List of Samyutta Nikaya suttas
List of Anguttara Nikaya suttas
List of Khuddaka Nikaya suttas

External links
Khuddaka Nikaya (Access to Insight)
Khuddaka Nikàya (MettaNet - Lanka)

Suttas
Lists of books about religion
Suttas, Khuddaka Nikaya